Inspector Tahar scors the goal (translit. Al-Mufattish Tāher Yusajjil al-Hadaf) is a 1975 Algerian comedy film directed by Kaddour Brahim Zakaria.

A simple case of a car accident in the city of Oran turns into a real criminal investigation led by Inspector Tahar and his sidekick apprentice.

Cast
 Hadj Abderrahmane as Inspector Tahar
 Yahia Benmabrouk as the apprentice
 Boumedienne Sirat as Omar
 Zoubida Ben Bahi as Malika

See also
 List of Algerian films

References

1975 films
1970s Arabic-language films
Algerian comedy films
1975 comedy films